Players and pairs who neither have high enough rankings nor receive wild cards may participate in a qualifying tournament held one week before the annual Wimbledon Tennis Championships.

Seeds

  Alexander Peya /  Alexander Waske (first round)
  Devin Bowen /  Tripp Phillips (qualifying competition, lucky losers)
  Rik de Voest /  Nathan Healey (qualified)
  Diego Ayala /  Brian Vahaly (qualifying competition, lucky losers)
  Stephen Huss /  Robert Lindstedt (qualified)
  Daniele Bracciali /  Giorgio Galimberti (qualified)
  Gergely Kisgyörgy /  Łukasz Kubot (qualified)
  Kenneth Carlsen /  Tuomas Ketola (qualifying competition, lucky losers)

Qualifiers

  Stephen Huss /  Robert Lindstedt
  Gergely Kisgyörgy /  Łukasz Kubot
  Rik de Voest /  Nathan Healey
  Daniele Bracciali /  Giorgio Galimberti

Lucky losers

  Devin Bowen /  Tripp Phillips
  Diego Ayala /  Brian Vahaly
  Kenneth Carlsen /  Tuomas Ketola

Qualifying draw

First qualifier

Second qualifier

Third qualifier

Fourth qualifier

External links

2004 Wimbledon Championships – Men's draws and results at the International Tennis Federation

Men's Doubles Qualifying
Wimbledon Championship by year – Men's doubles qualifying